The Ladd Formation is a Mesozoic geologic formation located in Orange County, California.

Paleofauna
Dinosaur remains (mainly hadrosaurid fragments) are among the fossils that have been recovered from the formation, although none have yet been referred to a specific genus. In 1927 Bernard Nettleton Moore found a hadrosaur maxilla with teeth while searching for ammonites in the formation. In 1950 Marlon V. Kirk found a plesiosaur centrum (spool of the vertebra). In 1978 Robert Drachuk, also while searching for ammonites, collected a hadrosaur cranial fragment from a limestone concretion. In 1992 Robert D. Hansen found the distal tibia of a hadrosaur.

See also

 List of dinosaur-bearing rock formations
 List of stratigraphic units with indeterminate dinosaur fossils

Footnotes

References
 Hilton, Richard P. 2003. Dinosaurs and Other Mesozoic Reptiles of California. Berkeley: University of California Press. 318 pp.
 Weishampel, David B.; Dodson, Peter; and Osmólska, Halszka (eds.): The Dinosauria, 2nd, Berkeley: University of California Press. 861 pp. .

Cretaceous California